Koninklijke Ahold Delhaize N.V. (in Dutch literally "Royal Ahold Delhaize"), commonly known as Ahold Delhaize, is a Dutch multinational retail and wholesale holding company. Its name comes from the merger between Ahold (Dutch) and Delhaize Group (Belgian), the two merging companies which form the present-day Ahold Delhaize. Its business format includes supermarkets, convenience stores, hypermarkets, online grocery, online non-food, drugstores, and liquor stores. Its 21 local brands employ 375,000 people at 6,500 stores in 11 countries, predominantly the Netherlands and Belgium.

Ahold Delhaize's international headquarters is in Zaandam, Netherlands; it is the headquarters of the merging partner company Ahold. Its brands are active in the Netherlands, Belgium, the Czech Republic, Greece, Luxembourg, Romania, Serbia, and the United States. It also participates in joint ventures in Indonesia and Portugal.

Ahold Delhaize shares are listed on Euronext Amsterdam and Brussels (ticker: AD). Ahold's CEO, Dick Boer, became the CEO of Ahold Delhaize until his retirement in 2018, and Frans Muller, former CEO of Delhaize Group, succeeded Dick Boer, after previously having served under Dick Boer's supervision, as the deputy CEO, chief integration officer and acting chief operations officer (ad interim) of Delhaize America. 

Operating more than 2,000 stores across 23 states, Ahold Delhaize is among the largest food and consumables retailers in the United States via their subsidiaries.

History
Ahold Delhaize was formed in July 2016, from the merger of Ahold and Delhaize Group. Delhaize Group dates back to 1867, when the Delhaize brothers opened a shop in Charleroi, Belgium. Ahold, originally named Albert Heijn N.V., started in 1887 when Albert Heijn bought the general store of his father in the Dutch town of Oostzaan. He gave the store his name, and transformed it into a modern specialized grocery,  together with his wife Neeltje Heijn. After a few years he owned a chain of Dutch stores. 

In 2018, the company experienced significant growth in the United States (Food Lion), the Netherlands, and online. Growth in Belgium has been minimal.

With around 380,000 employees in almost 7,000 stores, the company achieved a turnover of 66 billion euros in 2019.

Beginning in June of 2020, Ahold Delhaize implemented a partnership with Instacart to provide home delivery from more than 750 stores operated under the Hannaford, Food Lion, Giant Food, and Stop & Shop brands. The company further expanded in the United States with the acquisition of a majority stake in FreshDirect, an online grocer. As of 2021, Ahold Delhaize has plans to establish Ship2Me, an online marketplace featuring food and merchandise items, in the second half of the year.

Brands and formats 
Ahold Delhaize (co-)owns a number of supermarket chains and e-commerce businesses.

See also

References

External links
 

 
Companies based in North Holland
Companies in the Euro Stoxx 50
Companies listed on Euronext Amsterdam
Convenience stores
Dutch companies established in 2016
Holding companies of the Netherlands
Multinational companies headquartered in the Netherlands
Retail companies established in 2016
Retail companies of the Netherlands
Supermarkets of the Netherlands
Zaandam